The 2006 FIA GT Dijon 500 km was the sixth race for the 2006 FIA GT Championship season.  It took place on September 3, 2006.

Official results

Class winners in bold.  Cars failing to complete 70% of winner's distance marked as Not Classified (NC).

Statistics
 Pole Position – #9 Zakspeed Racing – 1:14.623
 Average Speed – 171.80 km/h

External links
 Official Results

D
FIA GT Dijon
FIA GT Dijon 500km